There are two species of gecko named Morocco lizard-fingered gecko:
 Saurodactylus mauritanicus
 Saurodactylus brosseti